The first version of this article has been based in the text of :el:Α.Π.Σ. Θύελλα of the Greek Wikipedia published under the GFDL.

Thyella ("Storm")(Greek:  Α.Π.Σ. Θύελλα A.P.S. Thyella) is an athletic club in Patras in the Achaia prefecture.

History
The club is one of the most popular in the entire prefecture of Achaia.  The team was first created on June 14, 1930 and in the same year, the team entered the third division.  Until 1938, the team reached the first category and played a protagonistic role and conquered many titles.  In 1959 the team played under the Olympiacos name and played in the second division in the 1960-61 season, they played in the same division by renaming the club back to Thyella.  Its colours are blue and white.  They belong to the Achaia Football Clubs Association and won the Achaia championship two times.

The team entered the fourth division.  For many years, the team played in the Prosfyghika Stadium and today plays in the same stadium which constructed after the games of the former president and player Fotis Aravantinou and Dimitri Andresa and the president Panagiotis Thanopoulos.  It has a central field along with two others, two of them plays in grass.

Participation

Second Division: 1961, 1964, 1965, 1966, 1967
Third Division: 1973, 1978, 1979, 1982, 2004, 2005, 2006
Fourth Division: 1985, 1987, 2002, 2003

Achievements
Achaia championship: 7:
1951, 1952, 1953, 1974, 1984, 1986, 2001
Fourth division championship: 1:
2003
Achaia Cup 1
1973
Second and Third Division Youth Championships: 1
2005

References

This article is mostly translated and incorporated from the Greek Wikipedia
Main Archive
Patras Press Museum
Proodos newspaper
Newspapers: Peloponnisos, I Imera, I Gnomi, Patra Spor
Lefkoma 100 Chronia Patraiko Podosfairo (100 Years of Football (Soccer) in Patras), City of Patras, 2006
Book: Fostiras 35 Chronia poreias (Fostiras: 35 Years) Vasilios Kyriazis 2005
https://web.archive.org/web/20070320150933/http://www.axaioi3.gr/
Thyella

External links
Official website

Association football clubs established in 1930
Sport in Patras
Football clubs in Western Greece
1930 establishments in Greece